The 1969 Princeton Tigers football team was an American football team that represented Princeton University during the 1969 NCAA University Division football season. Princeton was one of three Ivy League co-champions.

In their first year under head coach Jake McCandless, the Tigers compiled a 6–3 record and outscored opponents 248 to 138. Ellis O. Moore was the team captain.

Princeton's 6–1 conference record tied with Dartmouth and Yale as the best in the Ivy League. The Tigers outscored Ivy opponents 220 to 74. 

Princeton played its home games at Palmer Stadium on the university campus in Princeton, New Jersey.

Schedule

References

Princeton
Princeton Tigers football seasons
Ivy League football champion seasons
Princeton Tigers football